The 1973–74 season was Colchester United's 32nd season in their history and their sixth successive season in the fourth tier of English football, the Fourth Division. Alongside competing in the Fourth Division, the club also participated in the FA Cup and the League Cup.

Jim Smith led his side to promotion to the Third Division in his first full season in charge, finishing in third position, five points behind winners Peterborough United. Colchester experienced first round cup exits in both competitions, coincidentally losing to both teams which finished above them in the league; a defeat to Peterborough in the FA Cup and a defeat at Gillingham in the League Cup.

Season overview
Manager Jim Smith brought in Watford pair Mike Walker and Mick Packer during the summer break and also spent £8,000 on forward Paul Aimson from Bournemouth. While Aimson suffered a career-ending injury early in the season, Bobby Svarc found form and registered 25 league goals, including a record-equalling four goals at Chester in November.

At Christmas, Colchester led the Fourth Division table. Bobby Svarc's goalscoring waned, and Smith brought in Gary Moore on loan from Southend United. He scored seven goals in the U's eleven remaining games as Colchester sealed a promotion place. They finished in third position, five points behind Peterborough United and two adrift of Gillingham. The final home game of the season drew a crowd of 10,007, a game in which Gillingham won 2–0 and crept above Colchester in the league table. This would be the last time that Layer Road hosted a five-figure attendance in league competition.

In the cup competitions, Colchester were knocked out in the first round of both the FA Cup and League Cup, coincidentally against their two biggest league title rivals, Peterborough and Gillingham. Gillingham beat United 4–2 at Priestfield in the League Cup in August, while Peterborough triumphed 3–2 at Layer Road in the FA Cup first round.

Players

Transfers

In

 Total spending:  ~ £22,000

Out

 Total incoming:  ~ £28,000

Loans in

Match details

Fourth Division

Results round by round

League table

Matches

League Cup

FA Cup

Squad statistics

Appearances and goals

|-
!colspan="14"|Players who appeared for Colchester who left during the season

|}

Goalscorers

Disciplinary record

Clean sheets
Number of games goalkeepers kept a clean sheet.

Player debuts
Players making their first-team Colchester United debut in a fully competitive match.

See also
List of Colchester United F.C. seasons

References

General
Books

Websites

Specific

1973-74
English football clubs 1973–74 season